Mary Jane Fiesta Veloso is a Filipino woman who was arrested and sentenced to death for smuggling heroin into Indonesia. Her case, among others, sparked international attention towards Indonesia's capital punishment and drug prohibition laws.

Background
Veloso was born in Cabanatuan, Nueva Ecija. She is the youngest of five siblings. She dropped out in her first year of high school. She and her husband married when she was around 17 years old but they later separated. They have two sons. Prior to her arrest, in 2009, Veloso worked in Dubai in the United Arab Emirates for about six months. Her father said that she left her job because her employer attempted to rape her. She returned to her hometown and started a business peddling plastic containers, which unfortunately failed.

Conviction
Veloso was arrested in Indonesia in April 2010 for smuggling  of heroin in a suitcase. Throughout her trial, she maintained her innocence, claiming that she was duped into carrying the suitcase by her godsister, Maria Kristina Sergio, who convinced her to go to Indonesia after losing a job in Malaysia. Her Indonesian lawyer, Agus Salim, noted that she did not have any lawyer or Tagalog translator during her interrogation, and during her sentencing, she was represented by a public defender but her courtroom interpreter was not licensed.

Veloso was sentenced to death by the presiding judge in October 2010 in Yogyakarta's Sleman District Court, even though the prosecutor's verdict was a life sentence. Even so, she was spared due to a moratorium on capital punishment enacted by Indonesian President Susilo Bambang Yudhoyono. She was again scheduled to be executed in January 2015 after the election of Joko Widodo as President of Indonesia.

She was scheduled to be executed in Nusa Kambangan together with the Bali Nine duo from Australia, Andrew Chan and Myuran Sukumaran; Brazilian Rodrigo Gularte; an Indonesian and four Nigerians at 1:00 AM WIB (2:00 AM PHT) on 29 April 2015.

At midnight on 29 April 2015, Veloso was granted a stay of execution so she could act as a witness during the trial of her alleged human trafficker. News of the reprieve came so close to the scheduled time of her execution that several news outlets reported erroneously that it had occurred. The front-page headline on one newspaper read "Death Came Before Dawn". She was reprieved after reports that her trafficker had surrendered to the police, which had prompted Former Philippine President Benigno Aquino III to make a final appeal for clemency on the basis that her testimony could be invaluable in the prosecuting her alleged recruiter. Veloso's alleged trafficker Maria Kristina Sergio, along with Sergio's live-in partner Julius Lacanilao and an African national tentatively identified as "Ike", will face charges of human trafficking, illegal recruiting and estafa (fraud). Her mother believes Veloso was spared by a 'miracle'; the other eight prisoners scheduled for execution alongside her were executed by firing squad early on the morning of 29 April.

According to The Jakarta Post, on 12 September 2016, Indonesia President Joko Widodo reported that Philippines President Rodrigo Duterte had authorized Veloso's execution. However, on the same day, a Manila Bulletin article said that Manny Piñol, the Philippines Agriculture Secretary, said that Duterte had actually asked for clemency for Veloso.

Veloso was still awaiting execution in her Indonesian prison cell on 19 June 2017. In August 2016, motions were heard to depose her testimony regarding the human trafficking charges against Maria Kristina Sergio and Julius Lacanilao. The motion was granted, but no time was set for when the deposition was to occur. Judge Reyes denied a defense motion in November to block the deposition, stating she found no compelling reason to reverse her decision. On 13 February 2017, the Hon. Anarica J. Castillo-Reyes affirmed the motion to take Veloso's deposition. The resolution scheduled the deposition to be done on 27 April 2017. The Court of Appeals ordered a temporary restraining order on 24 March, preventing the prosecutor from interviewing Veloso. Associate Justice Ramon M. Bato Jr., on behalf of the Court of Appeals, issued a proclamation on 22 May finding in favor of the defense motion that disallowed taking Veloso's deposition, because it was claiming that it violated the plaintiffs' right to face their accuser.

On 16 June 2017, the Veloso family filed a motion for reconsideration through the National Union of Peoples' Lawyers (NUPL), asking the Court of Appeals to rescind the order preventing the prosecutor from deposing Veloso at the Yogyakarta prison. The family's argument for the motion was that Veloso may run out of time and be executed before she could testify. The motion stated, "No damage can be irreparable as what Mary Jane stands to suffer — to be muzzled before she is silenced forever, to die without ever being heard.” The Office of the Solicitor General (OSG) also requested the Court of Appeals to reconsider their ruling. The appeals court later affirmed their decision on 5 June 2018 through Bato, dismissing the motion filed by the OSG.

On 3 September 2018, the Veloso family, along with their lawyers from the NUPL, took the case to the Philippine's highest court, the Supreme Court of the Philippines, in an attempt to overturn the decision made by the Court of Appeals. In January 2019, rumors that Veloso had been executed spread, which were denied by both Indonesia's Attorney General's Office and her lawyer. After more than a year, on 9 October 2019, the Supreme Court granted the petition and reversed the Court of Appeals' decision preventing Veloso's deposition, stating that "to disallow the written interrogatories will curtail Mary Jane's right to due process". After a denied motion filed by lawyers from the Public Attorney's Office representing Sergio and Lacanilao, the Supreme Court reaffirmed their 2019 decision in a resolution dated 14 August 2020. Preparations for her testimony have begun, but a final date is yet to be set due to logistics issues caused by the COVID-19 pandemic, which had affected both the Philippines and Indonesia.

On 10 March 2021, Veloso was moved from Wirogunan II A women's prison to Wonosari II B women's prison in Gunung Kidul Regency, Yogyakarta, where she continued to earn money to send for her family by making batik cloth, with each sheet selling for between Rp. 600.000,- and several million Rupiah.

Impact
She has been compared to Flor Contemplacion and Sarah Balabagan due to their backgrounds as expatriate maids with death sentences.

Veloso's case gained support in Indonesia and internationally after her appeals for clemency were rejected. Notable Indonesians who supported her included chef Rahung Nasution, French-Indonesian singer Anggun, Archbishop Ignatius Suharyo Hardjoatmodjo,
and maid Erwiana Sulistyaningsih. Supporters in Veloso's home country of the Philippines included boxer Manny Pacquiao, who even visited her at her Yogyakarta prison, migrant and human rights organizations. Internationally, United Nations Secretary General Ban Ki-moon, Nobel Peace Prize winner and former East Timor President José Ramos-Horta, British tycoon Richard Branson, English musician Tony Iommi and American author Eve Ensler spoke publicly in support of Veloso.

The petition for her release at Change.org was the fastest-growing petition from the Philippines ever and gained over 250,000 signatories from over 125 countries. On 27 April 2015, during the ASEAN Summit in Kuala Lumpur, representatives from the ASEAN Youth Forum met with Widodo in an attempt to save Veloso's life.

References

Living people
Filipinos imprisoned abroad
Filipino prisoners sentenced to death
Inmates of Nusa Kambangan prison
Maids
People from Cabanatuan
1985 births
Filipino domestic workers
Filipino migrant workers